This is a list of diplomatic missions in Bhutan. At present, the capital of Thimphu hosts only three embassies, the fewest of any world capital. Many countries accredit an embassy in another country additionally to Bhutan, with New Delhi, India hosting many such embassies.

Honorary consulates are omitted from this listing.

Embassies
Thimphu

Consulates General

Phuntsholing

Non-resident embassies
Resident in New Delhi, India:

 

  

  
 
 
 
 

 

  

 
 

 

 
  
 

 

 
 

  

  
  
  

  

Resident in Dhaka, Bangladesh:

Resident in Beijing, China:

  

  

  

Resident in other places:

 (New York City, USA)
 (Hanoi, Vietnam) 
 (New York City, USA)
 (Abu Dhabi, UAE)
 (Washington DC., USA)
 (Washington DC., USA)
 (New York City, USA)
 (Canberra, Australia)

See also 
 Foreign relations of Bhutan
 List of diplomatic missions of Bhutan

References

Foreign embassies in Bhutan

Foreign relations of Bhutan
Diplomatic missions
Bhutan